Lapa (Turkish) or lapas (Greek λαπάς) is a kind of rice porridge or gruel eaten in the Balkans, Levant, and Middle East. It is made of just rice, water, and salt and has the consistency of a thick soup.

In Greek cuisine, it is used as a remedy for diarrhea, served with lemon juice.

Etymology
The dictionary of the Türk Dil Kurumu considers it a loanword from Pontic Greek ("Rumca").

Robert Dankoff gives it an Armenian origin:  լափ lap’ 'watery food for dogs, pap for babies'.

See also

 List of porridges

Notes

Balkan cuisine
Levantine cuisine
Cypriot cuisine
Rice dishes
Porridges